Kew is a district in the London Borough of Richmond upon Thames. Its population at the 2011 census was 11,436. Kew is the location of the Royal Botanic Gardens ("Kew Gardens"), now a World Heritage Site, which includes Kew Palace. Kew is also the home of important historical documents such as Domesday Book, which is held at The National Archives.

Julius Caesar may have forded the Thames at Kew in 54 BC during the Gallic Wars. Successive Tudor, Stuart and Georgian monarchs maintained links with Kew. During the French Revolution, many refugees established themselves there and it was the home of several artists in the 18th and 19th centuries.

Since 1965 Kew has incorporated the former area of North Sheen which includes St Philip and All Saints, the first barn church consecrated in England. It is now in a combined Church of England parish with St Luke's Church, Kew.

Today, Kew is an expensive residential area because of its suburban hallmarks.  Among these are sports-and-leisure open spaces, schools, transport links, architecture, restaurants, no high-rise buildings, modest road sizes, trees and gardens. Most of Kew developed in the late 19th century, following the arrival of the District line of the London Underground. Further development took place in the 1920s and 1930s when new houses were built on the market gardens of North Sheen and in the first decade of the 21st century when considerably more river-fronting flats and houses were constructed by the Thames on land formerly owned by Thames Water.

Etymology
The name Kew, recorded in 1327 as Cayho, is a combination of two words: the Old French kai (landing place; "quay" derives from this) and Old English hoh (spur of land). The land spur is formed by the bend in the Thames.

Governance
Kew forms part of the  Richmond Park constituency in the UK Parliament; the Member of Parliament is Sarah Olney of the Liberal Democrats. For elections to the London Assembly it is part of the South West London Assembly constituency, which is represented by Nicholas Rogers of the  Conservative Party.

Kew was added in 1892 to the Municipal Borough of Richmond which had been formed two years earlier and was in the county of Surrey. In 1965, under the London Government Act 1963, the Municipal Borough of Richmond was abolished. Kew, along with Richmond, was transferred from Surrey to the London Borough of Richmond upon Thames, one of 32 boroughs in the newly created Greater London.

Economy

The fashion clothing retailer Jigsaw's headquarters, which are now at Water Lane, Richmond, were previously in Mortlake Road, Kew.

A former industry in Kew was that of nameplate manufacturing, by the Caxton Name Plate Manufacturing Company, based on Kew Green.  The company was founded in 1964 and folded in 1997.

It was in Kew that viscose was first developed into rayon, in a laboratory near Kew Gardens station run by Cowey Engineering. Rayon was produced in a factory on South Avenue, off Sandycombe Road, before Courtaulds acquired the patents for rayon in 1904.

Also on a site near Kew Gardens station, the engineering company F C Blake, now commemorated in the Kew street name Blake Mews, produced petrol-powered traction engines in the late 19th and early 20th centuries.

Chrysler and Dodge

Currently, the Kew Retail Park stands on the site of a former aircraft factory established in 1918 by Harry Whitworth, who owned Glendower Aircraft Ltd. The factory built Airco DH.4s and Sopwith Salamanders for the British government in the First World War.

In 1923 the now-redundant aircraft factory was sold and it became a factory for road vehicles. From the 1920s until 1967, Dodge made lorries at this factory, with the model name Kew. Cars were also manufactured there. Dodge Brothers became a Chrysler subsidiary in 1928 and lorry production moved to Chrysler's car plant at Kew. In 1933 it began to manufacture a British chassis, at its works in Kew, using American engines and gearboxes. After Chrysler bought the Maxwell Motor Company and their Kew works, the cars of the lighter Chrysler range – Chryslers, De Sotos and Plymouths – were assembled at this Kew site until the Second World War. The various models of De Sotos were named Richmond, Mortlake and Croydon; Plymouths were Kew Six and Wimbledon.

During the Second World War this Chrysler factory was part of London Aircraft Production Group and built Handley Page Halifax aircraft assemblies. When wartime aircraft production ceased, the plant did not resume assembly of North American cars.

People

Royal associations with Kew

The Tudors and Stuarts
Charles Somerset, 1st Earl of Worcester (c.1460–1526) was granted lands at Kew in 1517. When he died in 1526 he left his Kew estates to his third wife, Eleanor, with the remainder to his son George.  In 1538 Sir George Somerset sold the house for £200 to Thomas Cromwell (c.1485–1540), who resold it for the same amount to Charles Brandon, 1st Duke of Suffolk. Brandon had probably already inhabited Kew during the life of his wife Mary Tudor, the daughter of Henry VII and widow of the French king Louis XII. According to John Leland's Cygnea Cantio ("Swan Song"), she stayed in Kew (which he refers to as "Cheva") for a time after her return to England.

One of Henry VIII's closest friends, Henry Norris (c.1482–1536), lived at Kew Farm, which was later owned by Elizabeth I's favourite, Robert Dudley, Earl of Leicester (1532–1588). This large palatial house on the Thames riverbank predated the royal palaces of Kew Palace and the White House. Excavations at Kew Gardens in 2009 revealed a wall that may have belonged to the property.

In Elizabeth's reign, and under the Stuarts, houses were developed along Kew Green. West Hall, which survives in West Hall Road, dates from at least the 14th century and the present house was built at the end of the 17th century.

Elizabeth Stuart, daughter of James I, later known as the  "Winter Queen", was given a household at Kew in 1608.

Queen Anne subscribed to the building of the parish church on Kew Green, which was dedicated to St Anne in 1714, three months before the Queen's death.

The Hanoverians
The Hanoverians maintained the strongest links with Kew, in particular Princess Augusta who founded the botanic gardens and her husband Frederick, Prince of Wales who lived at the White House in Kew. Augusta, as Dowager Princess of Wales, continued to live there until her death in 1721. Frederick commissioned the building of the first substantial greenhouse at Kew Gardens.

In 1772 King George III and Queen Charlotte moved into the White House at Kew.   Queen Charlotte died at the Dutch House in Kew in 1818.

King William IV spent most of his early life at Richmond and at Kew Palace, where he was educated by private tutors.

Georgian expansion
During the French Revolution, many refugees established themselves in Kew, having built many of the houses of this period.  In the 1760s and 1770s the royal presence attracted artists such as Thomas Gainsborough and Johann Zoffany.

Artists associated with Kew
Diana Armfield   (born 1920) lives in Kew.  She is known for landscapes, and has also painted portraits, literary subjects and still lifes. She has a particular interest in flower paintings, and is considered to owe much to the tradition of Walter Sickert. 
Franz (later Francis) Bauer (1758–1840) was an Austrian microscopist and botanical artist who became the first botanical illustrator at Kew Gardens. By 1790 he had settled at Kew, where as well as making detailed paintings and drawings of flower dissections, often at microscopic level, he tutored Queen Charlotte, her daughter Princess Elizabeth and William Hooker in the art of illustration, and often entertained friends and botanists at his home. He is buried at St Anne's, next to Thomas Gainsborough.
 The American-born English artist Walter Deverell (1827–1854), who was associated with the Pre-Raphaelite Brotherhood, lived at 352 Kew Road, then called Heathfield House. He had a studio at the end of the garden where there are now garages. In this setting he painted "The Pet".
 Bernard Dunstan    (1920–2017) lived in Kew. He was an artist, teacher, and author, best known for his studies of figures in interiors and landscapes. At the time of his death, he was the longest serving Royal Academician.
George Engleheart (1750–1829), who was born in Kew, was one of the greatest English painters of portrait miniatures.
 Walter Hood Fitch (1817–1892), botanical illustrator, lived on Kew Green.
Thomas Gainsborough (1727–1788) visited Kew many times, staying with his friend Joshua Kirby and, after Kirby's death, in a house probably rented by his daughter close to St Anne's Church, where he is buried.
Arthur Hughes (1832–1915), Pre-Raphaelite painter, lived and died at Eastside House, 22 Kew Green, Kew. The site is marked by a blue plaque.
Joshua Kirby (1716–1774) was a landscape painter, engraver, and writer, whose main artistic focus was "linear perspective", based on the ideas of English mathematician Brook Taylor. He was the son of topographer John Kirby, and the father of the writer Sarah Trimmer and the entomologist William Kirby. In 1760 he moved to Kew, where he taught linear perspective to George III. He was a Fellow of the Royal Society.
Sir Peter Lely (1618–1680), portrait painter, had a house on the north side of Kew Green. On almost exactly the same site, Jeremiah Meyer (1735–1789), miniaturist to Queen Charlotte and George III, built a house a century later. Meyer is buried at St Anne's.
Charles Mozley (1914–1991), artist and art teacher, lived and died at 358 Kew Road, Kew.
Victorian artist Marianne North (1830–1890) did not live in Kew, but she left to Kew Gardens her collection of botanic art, painted on her extensive overseas travels, and funded a gallery – the Marianne North Gallery – to house them.
 French Impressionist painter Camille Pissarro (1830–1903) stayed in 1892 at 10 Kew Green, on the corner of Gloucester Road, which is marked by a blue plaque. During his stay he painted Kew Gardens – Path to the Great Glasshouse (1892), Kew Greens (1892) and Church at Kew (1892). His third son, Félix Pissarro (1874–1897), painter, etcher and caricaturist, died in a sanatorium at 262 Kew Road in 1897.
Charles Shannon (1863–1937), artist best known for his portraits, died in Kew at 21 Kew Gardens Road.
Matilda Smith (1854–1926), the first official botanical artist of the Royal Botanic Gardens, lived at Gloucester Road, Kew.
The painter Johan Zoffany (1725–1810), who lived at Strand-on-the-Green, is buried in St Anne's churchyard.

Other notable inhabitants

Historical figures

William Aiton (1731–1793), botanist, was appointed director in 1759 of the newly established botanical garden at Kew, where he remained until his death. He effected many improvements at the gardens, and in 1789 he published Hortus Kewensis, a catalogue of the plants cultivated there. When he died, he was succeeded as director at Kew Gardens by his son William Townsend Aiton (1766–1849), who was also botanist, and was born in Kew. William Townsend Aiton was one of the founders of the Royal Horticultural Society. He retired in 1841 but remained living at Kew, although passing much of his time with his brother at Kensington where he died in 1849. Both father and son lived at Descanso House on Kew Green and are buried in St Anne's churchyard where the substantial family tomb is a prominent feature. Inside the church there is also a memorial to them.
David Blomfield (1934–2016), leader of the Liberal Party group on Richmond upon Thames Council, writer, book editor and local historian, lived in Kew.
Richard Cook (1957–2007),  jazz writer, magazine editor and former record company executive, was born in Kew.
 Stephen Duck (c.1705–1756), poet, lived in Kew.
 Prince Friso of Orange-Nassau (1968–2013), brother of King Willem-Alexander of the Netherlands, lived in Kew.
 Liberal Party leader Jo Grimond (1913–1993) lived on Kew Green.
 Sir William Hooker (1785–1865) and his son Sir Joseph Hooker (1817–1911), botanists and directors of Kew Gardens, lived at 49 Kew Green, Kew. The site is marked by a blue plaque.
John Hutchinson (1884–1972), botanist, lived on Kew Green, near Kew Gardens' Herbarium, during the Second World War.
 Elinor May Jenkins (1893–1920), war poet, lived at Sussex House, Kew Road. She is buried in Richmond Cemetery next to her brother Arthur Lewis Jenkins (1892–1917) who was also a poet.
 Alfred Luff (1846–1933),  cricketer, was born in Kew.
 Phil Lynott (1949–1986), Irish rock guitarist, songwriter, vocalist and leader of Thin Lizzy, lived in Kew.
 Andrew Millar (1705–1768), Scottish bookseller and publisher, owned a country home on Kew Green.
 Samuel Molyneux (1689–1728), Member of Parliament, and an amateur astronomer, who was married to Lady Elizabeth Diana Capel, the eldest daughter of the Earl of Essex, inherited Kew House on the death of Lady Capel of Tewkesbury. Molyneux set up an observatory at the house and collaborated there with James Bradley in innovative designs for reflecting telescopes. Kew House which later, as the White House, became the home of Prince Frederick and Princess Augusta, was pulled down in 1802 when George II's short-lived gothic "castellated palace" was built.
Desmond Morton (1891–1971), soldier, intelligence officer and personal assistant to Winston Churchill, 1940–45, lived at 22 Kew Green 1952–71.
 Conrad Noel (1869–1942), Church of England priest and prominent British Christian socialist, was born in Royal Cottage, Kew Green.
 Daniel Oliver (1830–1916), Professor of Botany at University College, London 1861–88 and Keeper of the Herbarium at Kew Gardens 1864–90), lived on Kew Green.
Harold Pinter (1930–2008), playwright, dramatist, actor and director, lived at Fairmead Court, Taylor Avenue, Kew.
Sir Hugh Portman, 4th Baronet (died 1632), MP for Taunton, lived in a house opposite Kew Palace.
Sir John Puckering (1544–1596), lawyer, politician, Speaker of the English House of Commons, and Lord Keeper from 1592 until his death, lived in Kew.
Anthony Saxton (1934–2015), advertising executive and headhunter, lived at 3 Mortlake Road in Kew, and was a churchwarden of St Anne's Church, Kew.
John Smith (1798–1888), botanist, the first curator at Kew Gardens, lived on Kew Green.
John Stuart, 3rd Earl of Bute (1713–1792), botanist and honorary director of Kew Gardens 1754–72, adviser to Princess Augusta and tutor to George III and, later, Prime Minister of Great Britain 1762–63, lived at King's Cottage, 33 Kew Green.
 Patrick Troughton (1921–1987), actor, most famous for playing the Second Doctor in the TV series Doctor Who, lived in Kew.
 George Vassila (1857–1915), cricketer, was born in Kew.
 Andrew Watson (1856–1921), the world's first black person to play association football at international level, retired to London in around 1910 and died of pneumonia at 88 Forest Road, Kew in 1921. He is buried in Richmond Cemetery.

Living people
Geoffrey Archer, fiction writer and former Defence Correspondent of ITN, lives in Kew.
Mick Avory, musician and former drummer with The Kinks, lives in Kew.
Nick Baird, group corporate affairs director of energy firm Centrica, lives in Kew.
Ray Brooks, actor, lives in Kew.
 Justin Lee Collins, comedian and television presenter, lives in Kew.
Sir David Durie, former Governor of Gibraltar, lives in Kew.
Simon Fowler, social historian and author, lives in Kew.
Krishnan Guru-Murthy, Channel 4 journalist, lives in Kew.
Sir Donald Insall, architect, conservationist and author, lives in Kew.
 Milton Jones, comedian, was brought up in Kew.
 Gabby Logan, TV presenter, and her husband Kenny Logan, rugby player, live in Kew.
 Serge Lourie, former Leader of Richmond upon Thames Council, and councillor for Kew for 28 years, lives in Kew.
 Steven McRae, dancer with the Royal Ballet, lives in Kew.
Paul Ormerod, economist, lives in Kew.
Helen Sharman, the first British woman in space, lives in Kew.
 Jenny Tonge, Baroness Tonge, former MP for Richmond Park, and a councillor for Kew for nine years, lives in Kew.

Demography
In the ten years from the time of the 2001 census, the population rose from 9,445 to 11,436, the sharpest ten-year increase in Kew since the early 20th century.  This was partly accounted for by the conversion of former Thames Water land to residential use, and increases in property sizes.  The figures are based on those for Kew ward, the boundaries of the enlarged parish having been adjusted to allow for all wards in the borough to be equally sized.

Homes and households

Ethnicity
In the 2011 census, 66.2% of Kew's population were White British. Other White was the second largest category at 16%, with 8.1% being Asian.

Transport
A main mode of transport between Kew and London, for rich and poor alike, was by water along the Thames which, historically, separated Middlesex (on the north bank) from Surrey: Kew was also connected to Brentford, Middlesex by ferry, first replaced by bridge in 1759. The current Kew Bridge, which carries the South Circular Road (the A205) was opened by King Edward VII and Queen Alexandra in 1903.

The A205 road commencing there passes through Kew as a single carriageway.  However Kew Road provides the main road link to Richmond. The M4 motorway starts a short distance north of Kew, providing access to Heathrow Airport and the west. The A316 road starts in Chiswick and continues over Chiswick Bridge and a complex junction with the South Circular Road at Chalker's Corner at the south-eastern end of the district.

Since 1869 rail services have been available from Kew Gardens station. London Underground (District line) services run to Richmond and to central London. London Overground trains run to Richmond and (via Willesden Junction) to Stratford.

The 65, 110 and R68 bus routes serve Kew.

River bus services supported by publicly funded Transport for London run from Kew Pier to Richmond and Hampton Court.

Nearest places
 Brentford
 East Sheen
 Richmond
 Gunnersbury
 Chiswick
 Mortlake
 Barnes
Nearest railway stations
 Kew Bridge station (South Western Railway)
 Kew Gardens station (London Overground; London Underground District line)
 North Sheen station (South Western Railway)
Bridges
Kew Bridge, which carries the A205 South Circular Road. Beside the bridge is Kew Pier, which serves tourist ferries operating under licence from London River Services.
Kew Railway Bridge

Parks and open spaces

Kew Green is used by Kew Cricket Club for cricket matches in the summer.
Kew Pond, near the northeast corner of Kew Green, believed to date from the tenth century, is originally thought to have been a natural pond fed from a creek of the tidal Thames. During high (spring) tides, sluice gates are opened to allow river water to fill the pond via an underground channel. The pond is concreted, rectangular in shape and contains an important reed bed habitat which is vital for conservation and resident water birds. The pond is managed in partnership with the Friends of Kew Pond.
 North Sheen Recreation Ground in Dancer Road, known locally as "The Rec", was originally part of an orchard belonging to the Popham Estate, owned by the Leyborne Pophams whose family seat was at Littlecote House, Wiltshire. Opened in June 1909 and extended in 1923, it now contains football pitches, a running track, a children's paddling pool, two extensive playgrounds, a large dog-free grassed area and a pavilion set amongst trees and shrubs. It is also the home of a local football club, Kew Park Rangers. A sports pavilion was opened in September 2011.
Pensford Field, previously playing fields of the former Gainsborough School, is now a nature reserve and also the home of Pensford Tennis Club.
 St Luke's Open Space, a quiet sitting area and toddlers' play area, was previously a playground for a former Victorian primary school.
 Westerley Ware is at the foot of Kew Bridge. It was created as a memorial garden to the fallen in the First World War, and also has a grass area, three hard tennis courts and a children's playground. Its name refers to the practice of netting weirs or "wares" to catch fish.

Sport and leisure
Kew's several other sports clubs include:
 North Sheen Bowling Club on Marksbury Avenue
 Priory Park Club on Forest Road – tennis and (until 2017) bowls
 Putney Town Rowing Club on Townmead Road
 Richmond Gymnastics Association on Townmead Road

The nearest football club in the Premier League is Brentford FC, whose stadium, opened in 2021, is on the other side of Kew Bridge, near Kew Bridge station.

Societies

The Kew Horticultural Society, founded in 1938, organises an annual show in late August/early September as well as talks, events and outings throughout the year.

The Kew Society, founded in 1901 as the Kew Union, is a civic society that seeks to enhance the beauty of Kew and preserve its heritage. It reviews all planning applications in Kew with special regard to the architectural integrity and heritage of the neighbourhood, and plays an active role in the improvement of local amenities. The Society, which is a member of Civic Voice, organises community events including lectures and outings and produces a quarterly newsletter.

The Richmond Local History Society is concerned with the history of Kew, as well as that of Richmond, Petersham and Ham.

Education

Primary schools
 Darell Primary and Nursery School is on Darell Road and Niton Road. It opened in 1906, as the Darell Road Schools, at the southern end of what had been the Leyborne-Popham estate. It was Richmond Borough Council's first primary school and was built in the Queen Anne Revival style style, in brick with white stone facings. Although it has been extended several times, it is now the only Richmond borough primary school still in its historic original pre-1914 building.
 Kew Riverside Primary School, on Courtlands Avenue, opened in 2003.
 The Queen's Church of England Primary School is in Cumberland Road, where it moved in 1969. In her will of 1719, Dorothy, Lady Capel of Kew House left to four trustees Perry Court Farm in Kent, which she had inherited from her father. One twelfth of the rent from the farm was to be given to St Anne's Church to establish a school in Kew. In 1810, a "Free School" was opened in the church for 50 children, financed by subscribers who gave one guinea a year, in addition to a contribution by King George III. In 1824 the school moved to a site near the pond on Kew Green.  The foundation stone was laid on 12 August, the birthday of King George IV, who gave £300 on condition that it be called "The King's Free School". Queen Victoria gave permission for it to be called "The Queen's School" and decreed that its title should change with that of the monarch.

Independent preparatory schools
 Broomfield House School, on Broomfield Road, was founded in 1876.
 Kew College, a co-educational school for 3- to 11-year-olds, was founded in 1927 by Mrs Ellen Upton in rooms over a shop in Kew. Mrs Upton's young daughter was one of the first pupils. The school later moved to Cumberland Road. In 1953, Mrs Upton retired and sold the school to Mrs Hamilton-Spry who, in 1985, handed over the buildings to a charitable trust to ensure the school's long term continuity.
 Kew Green Preparatory School, at Layton House, Ferry Lane, near Kew Green, opened in 2004.
 Unicorn School, established in 1970, is a co-educational, parent-owned school on Kew Road, opposite Kew Gardens.

Places of worship
Four churches in Kew are currently in use:

Former churches include:
 Kew Baptist Church, a Grace Baptist church, was founded in 1861 in Richmond as Salem Baptist Church. It moved in 1973 to a new building on Windsor Road in Kew, adopting the name Kew Baptist Church in 1990, and closed in 2020.
 the late 19th-century Cambridge Road Wesleyan Methodist Chapel, previously known as the Gloucester Road Wesleyan Methodist Chapel and also known as Cambridge Road Methodist Church, which was in use from 1891 to 1969. It is now  a private residence.
A late Victorian Salvation Army hall at 6 North Road, built in the style of a chapel, was converted into flats (1–5 Quiet Way) in the early 21st century.

Cemeteries and crematorium

Mortlake Crematorium and two cemeteries – North Sheen Cemetery and Mortlake Cemetery – are located in Kew. The crematorium serves the boroughs of Ealing, Hammersmith and Fulham, Hounslow and Richmond upon Thames and the two cemeteries are managed by Hammersmith and Fulham Council.

Literary references to Kew

I am His Highness' dog at Kew;
Pray tell me, sir, whose dog are you?
Epigram, engraved on the Collar of a Dog which I gave to his Royal Highness (Frederick, Prince of Wales), 1736 (Alexander Pope, 1688–1744)

And the wildest dreams of Kew are the facts of Khatmandhu.
In The Neolithic Age, 1892 (Rudyard Kipling, 1865–1936)

Go down to Kew in lilac-time, in lilac-time, in lilac-time; 
Go down to Kew in lilac-time (it isn't far from London!)
And you shall wander hand in hand with love in summer's wonderland; 
Go down to Kew in lilac-time (it isn't far from London!)
The Barrel-Organ, 1920 (Alfred Noyes, 1880–1958)

Trams and dusty trees.
Highbury bore me. Richmond and Kew
Undid me.
The Waste Land, 1922 (T. S. Eliot, 1888–1965)

Lady Croom: My hyacinth dell is become a haunt for
hobgoblins, my Chinese bridge, which I am assured is
superior to the one at Kew, and for all I know at Peking, is
usurped by a fallen obelisk overgrown with briars.
Arcadia, 1993 (Tom Stoppard, b. 1937)

See also
 Dodge 100 "Kew"
 Dodge 300
 Kew Gardens and Royal Botanic Gardens, Kew
 Kew Green
 Kew Letters
 Kew Mortuary
 Kew Observatory
 Kew Palace
 North Sheen

Notes

References

Sources
 Blomfield, David (1994). Kew Past. Chichester, Sussex: Phillimore & Co Ltd.

Further reading
 
 

Cloake, John (1996). Palaces and Parks of Richmond and Kew vol. II: Richmond Lodge and the Kew Palaces. Chichester: Phillimore & Co Ltd. . . OL 8627654M.
Cloake, John (2001). Cottages and Common Fields of Richmond and Kew. Chichester: Phillimore & Co Ltd. .

External links

Kew TW9 community website
Kew area profile
HistoryWorld: Kew timeline
The Kew Society
Richmond Local History Society

 
Areas of London
Chrysler factories
Districts of the London Borough of Richmond upon Thames
Districts of London on the River Thames
English artists
History of the London Borough of Richmond upon Thames
Royal residences in the United Kingdom
Wards of the London Borough of Richmond upon Thames